Francis X. Lawlor (1917 – November 5, 2013) was an American priest and politician notable for his advocacy against integration in Chicago.

Biography
Lawlor was born 1917 in The Bronx. He professed his vows in the Augustinian Order in 1938 and was ordained as a priest in 1945. He taught at St. Rita of Cascia High School from 1946 until 1968.

Lawlor came to prominence as the head of a coalition of white block clubs that fought against black residency west of Ashland Avenue. Lawlor would later claim his efforts were to prevent white flight. His advocacy brought him into conflict with Archbishop of Chicago John Cody.

In the 1969 Illinois election for one of two delegate positions from Illinois's 25th legislative district. In the 1971 Chicago City Council election, Lawlor defeated Paul Sheridan, the incumbent 16th ward Alderman who had moved from the majority-black 16th ward to the majority-white 15th ward. Lawlor succeeded the late Joseph Kriska. The 15th ward at the time included all or parts of West Englewood, Marquette Park, and Ashburn. Lawlor joined the anti-Daley voting bloc once on the City Council. He left after a single term to challenge Democratic candidate John G. Fary for Illinois's 5th congressional district in the 1975 special election. Lawlor, as the Republican candidate, lost to Fary.

After his term on the Chicago City Council, he served as the Pro-life Director for the Diocese of Rockford from 1976 to 1984 and Director of Moral Decency in Media from 1984 to 1992. He resided in semiretirement in St. Louis from 1994 to 2005. In 2010, he moved to Franciscan Village in Lemont, Illinois. He died of congestive heart failure on November 5, 2013.

References

1917 births
2013 deaths
Illinois Republicans
Chicago City Council members
20th-century American politicians
American Roman Catholic clergy of Irish descent
Clergy from St. Louis
People from Lemont, Illinois
Roman Catholic Archdiocese of Chicago